The 1969 European Wrestling Championships were held in the men's Freestyle style in Sofia Bulgaria 19 - 23 September 1969; the Greco-Romane style in Modena Italy 5 – 9 June 1969.

Medal table

Medal summary

Men's freestyle

Men's Greco-Roman

References

External links
Fila's official championship website

Europe
W
European Wrestling Championships
Euro  
1969 in European sport
Sports competitions in Sofia 
W
Euro